Louis McLane (1786–1857) was a U.S. senator from Delaware from 1827 to 1829.

Senator McLane may also refer to:

John McLane (1852–1911), New Hampshire State Senate
Susan McLane (1929–2005), New Hampshire State Senate

See also
Senator McClain (disambiguation)
Senator McLean (disambiguation)